A phase line may refer to:
 Phase line (mathematics), used to analyze autonomous ordinary differential equations
 Phase line (cartography), used to identify phases of military operations or changing borders over time